Nathaniel Kaschula (born 22 March 1947) is a South African cricketer. He played in one first-class match for Border in 1976/77.

See also
 List of Border representative cricketers

References

External links
 

1947 births
Living people
South African cricketers
Border cricketers